A cadastral community or cadastral municipality, is a cadastral subdivision of municipalities in the nations of Austria,  Bosnia and Herzegovina,  Croatia, the Czech Republic, Serbia, Slovakia, Slovenia, the Netherlands, and the Italian provinces of South Tyrol, Trentino, Gorizia and Trieste. A cadastral community records property ownership in a cadastre, which is a register describing property ownership by boundary lines of the real estate.

History
 
In 1764, at the behest of Empress Maria Theresa, a complete survey of the Habsburg lands was begun, initiated by the general staff of the Imperial and Royal Army under Field Marshal Count Leopold Joseph von Daun, who had become aware of the lack of reliable maps in the Seven Years' War. Maria Theresa's son Emperor Joseph II ordered the implication of a complete urbarium for property tax purposes in 1785. The present-day cadastre was completed after the Napoleonic Wars from 1817 onwards under Emperor Francis I of Austria (Franziszeischer Kataster). Since then, the Austrian (i.e. Cisleithanian) crown lands were subdivided in Katastralgemeinden; surveying in the Hungarian (Transleithanian) lands started in 1850. Municipalities as administrative subdivisions with certain rights of self-governance were not established until after the 1848 revolutions.

Most of the nowadays Katastralgemeinden once had been independent communes and were incorporated on the occasion of a municipal territory reforms. They can be further divided into smaller villages and localities (Ortschaften).  there are 7,847 Katastralgemeinden in Austria. For land registration, the unit identifier used in a Katastralgemeinde is "KG-Nr" (KG-Nummer, or number).

The Dutch system of kadastrale gemeenten was set up around 1830. When municipalities are merged, often the cadastral communes remain as they were, so one civil municipality can consist of more than one cadastral commune; but again, a cadastral commune can never be part of more than one civil municipality.

See also 
 Districts of Vienna
 Municipalities of South Tyrol
 Municipalities of Slovenia
 Municipalities of Croatia
 Municipality (Austria)

References

External links
 Cadastral Template -- A Worldwide Comparison of Cadastral Systems
 CT-C4 - Description of what kind of registers are operated and maintained in different countries

Surveying
Subdivisions of Austria
Subdivisions of Croatia
Subdivisions of the Czech Republic
Subdivisions of the Netherlands
Subdivisions of Slovakia
Subdivisions of Slovenia
Subdivisions of Italy
South Tyrol
Trentino
Province of Gorizia
Province of Trieste
Land registration
Legacy of Austria-Hungary